Atemlos is an album by Schiller.

Atemlos may also refer to:
Atemlos Live, a live album by Schiller 
Atemlos, an album by Kai Peterson
"Atemlos", a song by Nino de Angelo
"Atemlos", a song by Claudia Jung

See also
"Atemlos durch die Nacht", a song by Helene Fischer